Gil Ozeri is an American comedian, actor, and writer, best known for his work writing for Brooklyn Nine-Nine, Big Mouth, and Happy Endings.

Career 
Ozeri started his comedy career with the Upright Citizens Brigade in New York, and has continued to collaborate with many fellow UCB actors, including Ben Schwartz, Jon Daly, and Adam Pally. In addition to his television writing, he has gained attention for making short, surreal videos released via Snapchat. He has also garnered attention for stunts involving watching marathons of the entirety of the television shows Two and a Half Men and Entourage.

In April 2019, he was announced as a main cast member in an NBC pilot, Friends-in-Law.

Ozeri appeared on The George Lucas Talk Show charity fundraiser, The George Lucas Talk Show All Day Star Wars Movie Watch Along.

Personal life

Ozeri is Jewish. In 2017, Ozeri tweeted that his mother's father was a Holocaust survivor and refugee, and that his father's parents were Yemeni Jews who, in 1948, were airlifted and taken in by Israel.

Filmography

Film

Television

References 

Living people
American male film actors
American male television actors
American male voice actors
American male comedians
American Jews
American people of Yemeni-Jewish descent
American television writers
Year of birth missing (living people)